Pogonolepis stricta is a species of flowering plant in the family Asteraceae, which is endemic to Western Australia. It was first described by Joachim Steetz in 1845.

It is an annual herb, with yellow flowers (from August to November), growing to heights of 1 cm to 20 cm high on a variety of soils.

References

Taxa named by Joachim Steetz
Plants described in 1845
Gnaphalieae